Nigel Owusu (born 31 January 2003) is a Dutch professional footballer who plays as a left back for ADO Den Haag.

Personal life
Born in the Netherlands, Owusu has Ghanaian roots.

Career
Owusu was with AVV Zeeburgia before being welcomed into the youth academy at Ajax from 2012. After a spell wuth AZ Alkmaar, and still only seventeen, he was signed by ADO Den Haag in October 2020, and signed to a contract until the end of the 2021-22 season. He made his Eerste Divisie debut on 6 May 2022 against FC Emmen. In May 2022 he signed a new contract for two more seasons with the option of a third.

References

External links
 

2003 births
Living people
Dutch footballers
Association football defenders
ADO Den Haag players
Eerste Divisie players
Dutch people of Ghanaian descent